Palpita inusitata is a moth in the family Crambidae. It was described by Arthur Gardiner Butler in 1879. It is found in Japan and China (Zhejiang, Fujian, Hubei, Hunan, Guangdong, Guangxi, Guizhou).

References

Moths described in 1879
Palpita
Moths of Japan
Moths of Asia